Matuaism is a doctrine associated with the Namasudras of Bengal. It is a sect of Avarna Hinduism for in the main book Sri Sri Harililamrito and another one published from Germany, named Matusmritokotha, the varna system has been abolished and the creation theory is devoid of the apartheid custom.

See also 
Harichand Thakur
Matua Mahasangha

References

Hinduism in West Bengal